Delias madetes is a butterfly in the family Pieridae.It was described by Frederick DuCane Godman and Osbert Salvin in 1878. It is found in the Australasian realm.

The wingspan is about 75–85 mm.

Subspecies
Delias madetes madetes (New Ireland)
Delias madetes honrathi Mitis, 1893 (New Britain)
Delias madetes neohannoverana Rothschild, 1915 (New Hanover)

References

External links
Delias at Markku Savela's Lepidoptera and Some Other Life Forms

madetes
Butterflies described in 1878
Taxa named by Frederick DuCane Godman
Taxa named by Osbert Salvin